Kenneth B. "Ken" Lee (January 23, 1922December 23, 2010) was a former Speaker of the Pennsylvania House of Representatives.

Lee was first elected to the Pennsylvania House of Representatives in 1957. Prior to being elected to the Pennsylvania House of Representatives, Lee was in his third year as District Attorney of Sullivan County, Pennsylvania.

Lee was born in Tioga County, Pennsylvania. He was a United States Air Force pilot stationed in Italy during World War II. He graduated from Mansfield University of Pennsylvania and Dickinson School of Law.

References

External links

1922 births
2010 deaths
Speakers of the Pennsylvania House of Representatives
Republican Party members of the Pennsylvania House of Representatives
American prosecutors
County district attorneys in Pennsylvania
United States Army Air Forces pilots of World War II
Deaths from cancer in Pennsylvania
Deaths from melanoma
People from Tioga County, Pennsylvania
Military personnel from Pennsylvania
Mansfield University of Pennsylvania alumni
Dickinson School of Law alumni